Deaf to Our Prayers is the fourth full-length album by the German extreme metal band Heaven Shall Burn. The title was inspired by the famous poem "The Silesian Weavers" by German poet Heinrich Heine. The first video released for this album was of the song "Counterweight".

Track listing

Personnel 
Production and performance credits are adapted from the album liner notes.

 Heaven Shall Burn
 Marcus Bischoff – vocals
 Maik Weichert – guitars
 Alexander Dietz – guitars
 Eric Bischoff – bass
 Matthias Voigt – drums

Production
 Maik Weichert – production
 Alexander Dietz – production
 Jacob Hansen – mixing, mastering
 Patrick W. Engel – co-producer, additional guitar and bass
  – artwork, layout
 Axel Jusseit – bandphoto

Additional musicians
 Ralf Müller – synths, piano
 Revenge Falls – backing vocals on "The Greatest Gift of God"

Charts

References

External links 
 

2006 albums
Century Media Records albums
Heaven Shall Burn albums